The proposed Saturn IB-B was to be essentially an uprated Saturn IB using the new MS-IVB-2 upper stage, using the HG-3 engine, developed from the S-IVB and an uprated S-IB-A first stage.

External links
 astronautix.com
IB-B